Helene Margrete Bøksle (born April 1, 1981, Mandal, Norway) is a Norwegian singer and actress.

Career 
Bøksle performs a mixture of traditional Norwegian folk music and popular music. 
Bøksle has performed with singers such as Bjørn Eidsvåg, David Urwitz and Eurovision 1995 winners Secret Garden. 
Bøksle entered the Melodi Grand Prix 2011 with the song "Vardlokk".

Personal life 
Bøksle is married to Espen Tjersland and they have a son who was born in 2013.

Discography

Albums

Others
2009: Det hev ei rose sprunge (Christmas album) (rereleased in 2010 with 2 bonus tracks)

Video game soundtracks
2008: Age of Conan: Hyborian Adventures

Filmography 
 2003 Frelsesarmeens julekonsert

References

External links
 Official website 
 

Norwegian video game actresses
Living people
1981 births
People from Mandal, Norway
Norwegian stage actresses
21st-century Norwegian singers
21st-century Norwegian women singers